Fermoy is a town in County Cork, Ireland. Fermoy may also refer to:

Places
Fermoy (barony), County Cork; near the Irish town
Fermoy, Minnesota, United States
Fermoy, Ontario, Canada

Other
 Baron Fermoy,  title in the Peerage of Ireland created in 1856 for Edmond Roche
 Fermoy GAA, club based in the Irish town
 HMS Fermoy (J40), a Hunt-class minesweeper of the Royal Navy that served during both World War I and World War II